This is a list of Turkish football transfers in the summer transfer window 2013 by club. Only transfers of the Süper Lig is included.

Süper Lig

Fenerbahçe
Note: Flags indicate national team as has been defined under FIFA eligibility rules. Players may hold more than one non-FIFA nationality.

In:

Out:

Galatasaray

In:

Out:

Beşiktaş

In:

Out:

Trabzonspor

In:

Out:

Sivasspor

In:

Out:

Kasımpaşa

In:

Out:

Karabükspor

In:

Out:

Bursaspor

In:

Out:

Gençlerbirliği

In:

Out:

Akhisar Belediyespor

In:

Out:

Torku Konyaspor

In:

Out:

Eskişehirspor

In:

Out:

Çaykur Rizespor

In:

Out:

Kayseri Erciyesspor

In:

Out:

Gaziantepspor

In:

Out:

İstanbul Başakşehir

In:

Out:

Balıkesirspor

In:

Out:

df
Loret Sadiku

df Loret Sadiku

References

Transfers
Turkey
2014